is a village consisting of the islands of Kitadaitōjima and Okidaitōjima of Shimajiri District, Okinawa Prefecture, Japan.

As of October 2016, the village has an estimated population of 615 and a density of 47 persons per km2. The total area is 13.10  km2. All of the inhabitants live on Kitadaitōjima.

Climate
Kitadaitō has a tropical rainforest climate (Köppen climate classification Af) with very warm summers and mild winters. Precipitation is significant throughout the year; the wettest month is June and the driest month is February. The island is subject to frequent typhoons.

History
Kitadaitōjima remained uninhabited until formally claimed by the Empire of Japan in 1885. In 1900, a team of pioneers from Hachijōjima became the first human inhabitants of the island, and started the cultivation of sugar cane from 1903. Until World War II, Kitadaitōjima was owned in its entirety by Dai Nippon Sugar (now Dai Nippon Meiji Sugar), which also operated mines for the extraction of guano for use in fertilizer. After World War II, the island was occupied by the United States. The village of Kitadaitō was established in 1946. The island was returned to Japan in 1972.

Economy

Formerly heavily dependent on phosphate mining, the village economy is now based on cultivation of sugar cane, commercial fishing, and seasonal tourism. There is no port on the island and ships must be loaded/offloaded by crane.

Transport
The island has an airport, Kitadaito Airport, with one flight a day to Minami-Daito Airport

Education

There is the Kitadaito Village Kitadaito Elementary-Junior High School (北大東村立北大東小中学校 Kitadaitō Sonritsu Kitadaitō Shōchūgakkō) and the Kitadaito Village Kitadaito Kindergarten (北大東村立北大東幼稚園 Kitadaitō Sonritsu Kitadaitō Yōchien'').

References

External links

 Kitadaitō official website 
 Kitadaito Elementary-Junior High School 
 

Villages in Okinawa Prefecture
Daitō Islands
Populated coastal places in Japan